A Tesla Supercharger is a 480-volt direct current fast-charging technology built by American vehicle manufacturer Tesla, Inc. for electric cars. The Supercharger network was introduced on September 24, 2012, with six Supercharger stations. , Tesla operates 40,432 Superchargers in 4,470 stations worldwide, an average of over 9 chargers per station. There are 1,772 stations in North America, 1,801 in the Asia/Pacific region, and 897 in Europe.  Supercharger stalls have a connector to supply electrical power at maximums of 72 kW, 150 kW or 250 kW, depending on the Supercharger generation.

Tesla Model S was the first car to be able to use the network, followed by the Tesla Model X, Tesla Model 3, and Tesla Model Y. Some Tesla cars have free supercharging for life, while others have annual or one-time credits. Usage is typically billed by energy consumed, although stations in jurisdictions that prohibit billing-by-consumption instead bill by time spent charging. An idle fee may be charged (depending on the percent occupancy of the Supercharger station) for continuing to be plugged into the Supercharger after charging has been completed.

Tesla has taken steps to focus use of the Superchargers on making longer journeys. In late 2017, Tesla restricted commercial, ride-hailing service, taxicab, and government usage of the public Supercharger network, requiring paying on a pay-per-use basis.

Supercharger technology

Notes

The original V1 and V2 Tesla supercharging stations charge with up to 150 kW of power distributed between two cars with a maximum of 150 kW per car, depending on the version. V1 Superchargers are only capable of delivering a maximum of 105kW per car. Each Supercharger cabinet with twelve charger modules feeds two charging stalls (max 150 kW per car), so if two cars are charging at the same time their charging rate may be reduced. On the original 85kWh Model S, they take about 20 minutes to charge to 50%, 40 minutes to 80%, and 75 minutes to 100%. The charging stations provide high-power direct-current (DC) charging power directly to the battery, bypassing the internal charging power supply.

In September 2017, Tesla announced the availability of urban Superchargers. The urban Superchargers are more compact than the standard Supercharger stalls, and will be primarily deployed in urban areas such as mall parking lots and garages. Compared to the standard Superchargers, urban Superchargers have a maximum power delivery of 72kW. Instead of 150kW distributed between two vehicles at a Supercharger A/B stall pair, each Urban Supercharger stall provides dedicated 72kW capacity.

In addition to the Superchargers, Tesla also has Tesla destination chargers, which are located places that a driver may stop for reasons other than charging, such as hotels, restaurants, and shopping centers.  These chargers are slower (typically maximum of 22 kW or 11.5 kW for newer vehicles in the US) than Superchargers, and are intended to charge cars over several hours. , Tesla has distributed 23,963 destination chargers worldwide.  Destination chargers are usually subsidized by the business that operates them as a free amenity to customers. 

Some Tesla supercharging stations use solar panels to offset energy use and provide shade.

Tesla makes V3 superchargers at Giga New York. Tesla first opened V3 stations in 2019, and they can provide up to 15 miles per minute (depending on circumstances). A 1 MW charge box supplies 4 stalls at up to 250 kW each, and can have a 575 kW battery storage. However the grid input is limited to around 350 kW. However, as the car battery is also limited by a charge curve, cars will not use the peak charge rate for the entire duration of battery charging.  For this reason, increasing the peak charge rate from 150 kW to 250 kW does not have a 1:1 proportional decrease in the time needed to reach full charge.

In late 2019, on a busy Thanksgiving weekend in San Luis Obispo, California, Tesla deployed a mobile Supercharger set-up on a flatbed trailer, offering additional charging capacity powered by a Tesla Megapack energy storage system.

Connectors and interoperability

As of March 2020, the network is exclusive to Model S, Model X, Model 3, and Model Y cars. Supercharging hardware is standard on all Model X, Model 3, and Model Y cars, and is standard on Model S cars equipped with a battery of 70kWh or greater, and optional (with a one-time payment of ) on Model S vehicles equipped with a 60kWh battery. The original Roadster is not equipped to charge from the Superchargers, but Tesla states that all future Tesla cars will include the ability.

In the European market, Tesla had been using the standardized IEC 62196 Type 2 connector for Model S and Model X cars and Superchargers. Tesla announced in November 2018 that it was updating all Superchargers in the EU to add CCS/Combo2 connectors, as an additional connector to the existing DC Type 2 connector. In the same announcement it was stated that this CCS/Combo2 connector will be the connector used for the Model 3 due the following year. This brings complete compatibility with the legislated charging standard for EU public charging. Existing Model S and X cars will be given the option of an adapter for CCS/Combo2 that allows those cars to use the EU standard public infrastructure as well. There will remain an incompatibility with imported US Tesla cars (that all use a Tesla proprietary connector). In 2017, Tesla was the only automobile manufacturer offering direct current (DC) charging based on the IEC 62196-2 specification. Other manufacturers also use the IEC 62196-3 Combined Charging System (CCS) charging standard. Other CCS charging networks can charge some Tesla cars faster than the Tesla V3 superchargers, depending on conditions.

Tesla has indicated on multiple occasions that they were interested in having discussions with other auto manufacturers about sharing the Supercharger network, however no agreements have been completed or made public to date. Tesla published specifications for its 1000 volt "North American Charging Standard (NACS)" in December 2022 hoping to attract other auto manufacturers, and extending the format war with CharIN's CCS standard. In the United States, to share in the $7.5 billion federal incentives being offered to build a charging infrastructure, Tesla announced in February 2023 it will open 3,500 new and existing Supercharger stations to non-Tesla vehicles by the end of 2024. Toward that end, Tesla then also launched, in just a few locations, its "Magic Dock" version of the Supercharger. The new dock holds captive a small NACS-to-CCS adapter, in which the charger (NACS) plug is docked when not in use. After a CCS car driver reserves a charger via the Tesla mobile app, the Magic Dock knows to release the CCS adapter attached to the NACS plug. The system "magic" is that the adapter always remains captive - either in the charger dock, for Tesla drivers, or on the plug for CCS.

Supercharging network
Tesla Supercharger stations allow Tesla vehicles to be fast-charged and are often located near restaurants with restrooms and other commerce areas. Tesla is in discussions to possibly open the network for usage by other EVs in Scandinavia.

The average number of Tesla cars per Supercharger stall was 34 in 2016. Cost estimates per station range from US$100,000 in 2013 to US$270,000 in 2015, depending on the number of stalls and other circumstances. Tesla estimates that station equipment lasts 12 years.

Most car charging occurs at home or work, a situation that Tesla has compared to cell phone charging. , less than 10% of charging came from Superchargers. In the month of July 2019, Tesla delivered 72 GWh through Superchargers.

Most Supercharger stations are owned by Tesla, but some are owned by fleet operators to charge their Tesla cars, such as taxis. These charger stalls are limited to 60 kW. In December 2017, Tesla changed its terms of service so that any vehicles being used as taxis or for commercial, ride-share, or government purposes were effectively banned from using Superchargers. This ban only applies to vehicles bought after December 15, 2017. Other charging options would be provided for these vehicles.

For 2021, Tesla states the network had 99.96% uptime (at least 50% daily capacity) and its power was 100% renewable (through solar power on-site and through purchasing electricity which was matched to renewable generation.)

Costs 
Unlimited supercharging for life is free for all Model S and Model X cars that were ordered before January 15, 2017, or between August 2, 2019 and May 26, 2020, or for vehicles that were purchased using a referral code during certain periods.

Model S and Model X cars that were ordered between January 15, 2017, and November 2, 2018, received 400 kWh (about ) of free Supercharging credits per year. Once those credits are used, supercharging has a fee.

Between May 2017 and September 18, 2018, Tesla allowed existing owners to give free unlimited supercharging for life to up to five friends if the friend purchased a new Tesla and used their referral code.  Tesla also offered all existing Tesla owners who purchased a new Model S, Model X or Performance Model 3 for themselves with free unlimited supercharging for life on those cars.

From time to time, Tesla has offered 1,000 or 2,000 miles of free supercharging as an incentive to purchase a new Tesla car.

Other than the above situations, Tesla Model S and Model X cars purchased between November 2, 2018, and August 2, 2019, and all Model 3 and Model Y cars purchased at any time do not receive any supercharging credits. Any charges are automatically billed to the Tesla account the car is associated with or to the credit card on file for that account. 

Some jurisdictions require charging operators to bill users by time, not by kWh delivered, and Tesla uses 60 kW sections to bill for different power levels.

Idle fees 
Since December 16, 2016, any car that remains connected to a Supercharger for more than 5 minutes after hitting the car's set charge limit may incur additional 'idle' fees. In the United States, there is no additional fee if the Supercharger station is less than half full, a fee of $0.50 per minute if the station is at least 50% full, and a fee of $1.00 per minute when the station is 100% full. Any incurred fees must be paid by the time of the next service visit.

Deployment 

In October 2014, there were 119 standard Tesla Supercharger stations operating in the United States, 76 in Europe, and 26 in Asia.

The number of Supercharger stations worldwide grew to 280 by the end of 2014; 584 by the end of 2015; and 1,045 by the end of 2017. By December 2014, two stations were solar powered. A solar-assisted Supercharger was opened in Belgium in 2017. , Tesla had plans to expand the network to 15,000 stalls. , Tesla operates 16,103 Superchargers in 1,826 stations worldwide; these include 908 stations in the U.S., 98 in Canada, 16 in Mexico, 520 in Europe, and 398 in the Asia/Pacific region.

Tesla announced in November 2020 it has deployed 20,000 Supercharger stalls. Six months later (May 2021), Tesla expanded to 25,000 Supercharger stalls and 30,000 Supercharger stalls a year later (November 2021).

North America
2012 saw six initial Supercharger stations around the United States, located at strategic points on the Boston-to-Washington and Los Angeles-to-San Francisco highway corridors. By mid-July 2013, 15 stations were open across the United States, with the number expected to nearly double by the end of the summer. The stations were developed and mass constructed in cooperation with Black & Veatch. Supercharging stations were available in Canada along Ontario Highway 401 and Quebec Autoroute 20 corridor between Toronto and Montreal by 2014.

The initial network was built in high-traffic corridors across North America, followed by networks in Europe and Asia in the second half of 2013. The first Supercharger corridor in the US opened with free access in October 2012. This corridor included six stations placed along routes connecting San Francisco, Lake Tahoe, Los Angeles, and Las Vegas. A second corridor was opened in December 2012 along the Northeast megalopolis, connecting Washington, DC, Baltimore, Philadelphia, New York City and Boston. This corridor includes three stations in highway rest areas, one in Delaware and two adjacent ones in Connecticut. At some stations, the electricity is paid by local business to attract customers.

According to Musk, "...we expect all of the United States to be covered by the end of next year [2013]". He also said that early Tesla owners' use of the network would be free forever.

Most of the southern Trans-Canada Highway was covered at the end of 2019.

Europe
In early 2015, the first European Supercharger was upgraded with a 'solar canopy' (a carport with solar cells on the roof) in Køge, Denmark. According to the person responsible for Tesla's Superchargers in the Nordic countries, Christian Marcus, the 12-stall  Supercharger in Køge has  solar cells with a projected annual production of about 40MWh and is  equipped with its own battery bank for temporary storage of excess production. Unlike most other European Supercharger stations, Tesla has bought the land on which the Køge Supercharger stands. On April 26, 2016, Kostomłoty became the first charger to open in Poland. Tesla opened a grid-connected 2-stall Supercharger at Nürburgring in 2019. There are a few privately operated Supercharger stations such as the one opened on April 27, 2016, in Zarechye, Russia, with 3 stalls.

The European Supercharger network is planned to allow a Model S to drive from the North Cape (near Honningsvåg) in Norway to Istanbul or Lisbon. , the Supercharger closest to Istanbul is the one in Plovdiv (Bulgaria), and the one nearest to Lisbon is Alcácer do Sal. The map of current and planned sites includes every European Union country except Malta and Cyprus, and represents all of the countries in the world in the top 10 of electric vehicle adoption rates.

Tesla started testing the charging of non-Tesla cars in Netherlands in 2021, and in Norway in early 2022 on 15 large uncongested stations. Tesla opened up many uncongested stations for non-Tesla cars in several countries during 2022, including France, Germany, Italy, Spain, Sweden and United Kingdom. Tesla cars have priority.

Asia-Pacific
Superchargers operate in China, where Shanghai has 1,000 chargers at 100 locations in late 2021, Beijing has 800, and Tibet is accessible.

Australia, Japan, Macau, New Zealand, South Korea, and Taiwan also have Superchargers. Tesla contracts Infigen Energy to supply electricity for its Australian Superchargers.

, Hong Kong had the highest density of Tesla Superchargers in the world, with eight stations with a total of 54 Supercharger stalls, allowing most Model S owners to have a Supercharger within 20 minutes' drive.

In 2016, Tesla also announced plans to deploy a nationwide network of Superchargers in India. No deployments as of 2021.

Large Supercharger stations 
A minimum of 40 stalls at a location is required to be listed below.

Battery-swap proposal

Tesla announced the "Tesla station" in June 2013, which demonstrated extremely fast recharging via a 90-second battery swapping process and small fee as an alternative to regular Supercharger fast chargers for Tesla Model S vehicles. By December 2014, 18 months after the initial announcement, no battery swapping stations had yet opened to the public, but Tesla announced a pilot battery-swap program would begin shortly at a single California site to gauge demand. With little demonstrated use by June 2015, Tesla began winding down the pilot battery swapping station.

Early plans and projections

In an interview published in 2009, Tesla CEO Elon Musk claimed that automated battery swapping would be the standard method of recharging its vehicles. The Tesla Model S was designed from the outset to support fast charging through battery swapping, with Tesla publicly discussing the capability as early as March 2009. Tesla filed a Form 10-Q with the Securities and Exchange Commission in May 2013, which included several factors that may influence the adoption of its vehicles such as "our capability to rapidly swap out the Model S battery pack and the development of specialized public facilities to perform such swapping, which do not currently exist but which we plan to introduce in the near future".

Demonstration
At an event in June 2013 at Tesla's design studio in Los Angeles, CEO Elon Musk demonstrated a battery swap operation with the Tesla Model S, which took slightly longer than 90 seconds each for the two cars participating in the demo. The swapping operation took less than half the time needed to refill a gasoline-powered car used for comparison purposes during the event. A patent was filed in 2014 and granted in 2019.

Pilot implementation
Also at the June 2013 demonstration, Tesla announced it planned to deploy a battery swapping station at each of its existing Supercharger stations, which would be renamed Tesla stations. Each swapping station was projected to cost  and have approximately 50 batteries available without requiring reservations. 

Owners also would have the option to swap back to their own battery pack, fully charged, on the return trip for no extra payment. Tesla also planned to offer an option to keep the pack received on the swap, paying the price difference if the battery received is newer; or to receive the original pack back from Tesla for a transport fee. The billing would be handled via customer credit card on file with Tesla.

The first Tesla Station with battery-swapping capability was scheduled to be built in California late in 2013, but this was subsequently delayed. Elon Musk said at an event in February 2014 that a few battery swap stations would be opened in the next few months along the route between Los Angeles and San Francisco, and that the initial stations would be studied before deciding to build any more.

By December 2014, 18 months after the proof-of-concept demonstration, no battery-swapping stations had been opened to the public; on 19 December, Tesla announced it would implement a "Battery Swap Pilot Program" to build a single battery-swapping station near the Supercharger station at Harris Ranch near Coalinga, California. The Harris Ranch swapping station would be used to "assess demand" for the paid service, offered only to invited Model S owners by appointment. The company stated they would "evaluate relative demand from customers ... to assess whether it merits the engineering resources and investment necessary" for the upgrade of additional first-generation Supercharger stations. The scheduled duration of the swap had doubled to three minutes. By the time the service launched in 2015, actual swap times varied from five to fifteen minutes.

Work on the battery swapping station, housed in a former car wash building, was underway by late December. The Harris Ranch swapping station was open by March 2015. When journalist Edward Niedermeyer observed the battery swap station over the Memorial Day weekend in May 2015, it was serving as a secondary Supercharger station, powered by diesel generators, rather than swapping batteries. In June 2015, Tesla announced that of 200 invitations sent out to try the pilot pack-swap station, only approximately five tried it. Tesla then invited all California Model S owners to try it out, but expected a low usage rate. A survey showed that most users were not interested.

Discontinuation
The company later indicated that battery swapping capabilities was no longer a significant part of Tesla's plans for on-road energy replacement for their vehicles. Musk noted that Supercharger technology had advanced sufficiently and claimed "people don't care about pack swap" at the 2015 annual shareholder meeting. By November 2016, the battery swap station at Harris Ranch was no longer accepting appointments.

In 2021, Tesla China denied that it was planning to begin battery swapping, based on a new business registration, and added the concept of battery swapping was "riddled with problems and not suitable for widescale use."

Regulatory issues
The California Air Resources Board (CARB) classifies Zero Emission Vehicles (ZEVs) according to their range and speed of range replenishment through charging or refueling, granting more credits for cars that had a long range and short replenishment times. As initially released in 2012, the Model S with an 85 kW-hr battery was classified as a Tier 3 ZEV, which meant it had a minimum range of at least  on a single charge without considering replenishment speed, earning Tesla four credits per Model S sold. The language of the ZEV regulation allowed CARB to credit a vehicle with fast replenishment capabilities through a technology demonstration, such as the June 2013 event, regardless of whether that capability was in widespread use, which was perceived as a loophole; Niedermeyer said "it's no surprise that Tesla engineered the Model S to be swap-capable" to earn the extra credits.

CARB staff subsequently considered modifying the ZEV regulation to exclude battery swapping as a "fast refueling" technology altogether; this change would deny Tesla some of the ZEV credits that the manufacturer might otherwise receive when the battery-swapping station was placed in service in California.  During the public comment phase, Tesla proposed "manufacturers wishing to receive fast refueling designation submit data on an annual basis to ARB staff showing that their fast refueling technology is both available and in use by customers", resulting in a modified proposal. Starting with the 2015 model year, the ZEV regulation was updated so that fast-replenishment capability was based on "actual fast refueling events", rather than merely demonstrating the potential to do so.

Tesla Megacharger
Tesla announced a higher-capacity "Megacharger" along with the unveiling of a prototype for its Tesla Semi, a semi-trailer truck, in November 2017. Trucks would use the Tesla Megacharger Network to charge. To accomplish this, analysts estimated it would likely have a charge output level of over one megawatt.

The first Megacharger was installed at Giga Nevada in November 2021.  A second Megacharger was permitted for construction at a Pepsi facility in Modesto, California, in late 2021.

Tesla publicly released additional details of the Megacharger and its cable at the delivery event for the first Tesla Semis in December 2022. The new megawatt-class cable for the V4 charger will support three times the current density of the existing 2021/2022 superchargers (v3)—35 amps/mm2 vs. approximately 12 for the v3 superchargers—and the cable will be liquid-cooled to support 1000 amp charge rates at 1000 volts. The upcoming Tesla Cybertruck will also be able to support v4 chargers when the Cybertruck is released in 2023.  Dan Priestly, Tesla Semi Program manager, also indicated that the v4 charger technology would be "coming to our Superchargers" in 2023.

Controversy

In Germany, most of the superchargers do not use a certified DC electricity meter and thus don't comply with German law. The retrofitting of the meters is expected to be completed by the end of 2023.

See also
 Charging station
 Electric vehicle charging network
 Electrify America

References

External links
 
 
 Video of battery swap
 Charts of Supercharger stations over time

Automotive technologies
Charging stations
Supercharger
Commercial machines